Newstead-on-Ancholme Priory was a priory  in Lincolnshire, England.

The Gilbertine priory of Holy Trinity, Newstead-on-Ancholme, was founded for Gilbertine canons by King Henry II in 1171. The endowment was small, and the number of canons and lay brothers was limited by Saint Gilbert to thirteen.

The priory was surrendered in 1538, by the prior, Robert Hobson, and five canons. Newstead Priory farmhouse, a grade I listed building was built on the site, and one room in the farmhouse is a vaulted room of the Gibertine priory, possibly part of the refectory.

References

Monasteries in Lincolnshire
Gilbertine monasteries
1171 establishments in England
Christian monasteries established in the 12th century
1538 disestablishments in England